Francis's wooly horseshoe bat (Rhinolophus francisi) is a species of bat in the family Rhinolophidae found in Malaysia and Thailand. It was named in honor of Charles M. Francis.

References

Rhinolophidae
Mammals described in 2015
Bats of Southeast Asia